EDHS may refer to:
 East Davidson High School, Thomasville, North Carolina, United States
 East Dubuque High School, East Dubuque, Illinois, United States
 El Dorado High School (disambiguation)

See also 
 Edh (disambiguation)